Judith Evelyn (born Evelyn Morris, March 20, 1909 – May 7, 1967) was an American-Canadian stage and film actress who appeared in around 50 films and television series.

Early years
Evelyn was born Evelyn Morris in 1909 (later shaving four years off of her age) in Seneca, South Dakota, United States and raised in Moose Jaw, Saskatchewan. She attended the University of Manitoba, where she was active in drama, and she developed her acting skills at Hart House at the University of Toronto.

Career
Evelyn worked on radio both for the British Broadcasting Corporation and for the Canadian Broadcasting Corporation. 

Her early stage experience included being a member of a Canadian Chautauqua unit in 1932. The next year, she performed with the Pasadena Community Playhouse in California.

Evelyn appeared on Broadway in the following plays:
 The Shrike as Ann Downs (January 15, 1952 – May 31, 1952)
 Craig's Wife (February 12, 1947 – April 12, 1947) (revival)
 The Rich Full Life (November 9, 1945 – December 1, 1945)
 Angel Street as Bella Manningham (December 5, 1941 – December 30, 1944)

All of the four plays were made into films, but Evelyn did not appear in any of them. She did appear in other films, including the role as Miss Lonelyhearts, the lonely alcoholic in Alfred Hitchcock's Rear Window. In 1956, Evelyn played the role of Nancy Lynnton in George Stevens' Giant. She had a brief performance as Queen Mother Taia in Michael Curtiz's The Egyptian and was featured with Vincent Price in The Tingler (1959).

In the fall of 1958, Evelyn guest-starred as Clara Keller in the episode "Man in the Moon" of the docudrama Behind Closed Doors. The following year, in the episode "Double Reverse" on the Western series Tales of Wells Fargo.

Professional awards
In 1942, Evelyn won the Distinguished Performance Award from The Drama League, an award that is "bestowed each season on a single performer from over sixty nominated performances from Broadway and Off-Broadway."

Personal life and death

On September 3, 1939, Evelyn and her fiancé, Canadian radio producer Andrew Allan, survived the sinking of the Anchor-Donaldson liner SS Athenia. The Athenia was the first British passenger liner to be torpedoed and sunk by a German submarine in World War II.

Evelyn, at age 58, died from cancer in New York City on May 7, 1967. She is interred at the Kensico Cemetery in Valhalla, New York.

Filmography

References

External links

 
 

1909 births
1967 deaths
American film actresses
American stage actresses
Actresses from South Dakota
Deaths from cancer in New York (state)
People from Faulk County, South Dakota
Burials at Kensico Cemetery
20th-century American actresses
Canadian film actresses
Canadian stage actresses
People from Moose Jaw